Shehu Sanda Kura bin Ibrahim al-Kanemi was the Shehu of Borno from 1922 to 1937.

Reign
Shehu Sanda Kura, son of Shehu Ibrahim Kura of Borno and brother of Shehu Abubakar Garbai, was the Shehu of Borno from 1922 to 1937.

References

Dynasty

Royalty of Borno
1937 deaths
Year of birth missing